Metacosmesis illodis is a moth in the Carposinidae family. It is found in the Philippines (Luzon).

References

Natural History Museum Lepidoptera generic names catalog

Carposinidae